The Romance of an American Duchess is a 1915 American short silent drama film starring Richard C. Travers. Gloria Swanson had an uncredited role.

Cast
 Richard C. Travers as Duke de Longtour 
 Estelle Scott as Countess Maria
 Sidney Ainsworth as Marquis Ferdinand
 Ruth Stonehouse as Stephana Martin
 Gloria Swanson as Minor Role (uncredited)

References

External links

1915 films
1915 drama films
1915 short films
Silent American drama films
American silent short films
American black-and-white films
Essanay Studios films
1910s American films
1910s English-language films
English-language drama films
American drama short films